Bishop Bowers School is a private school under the Catholic Archdiocese of Accra. It was founded by the Missionary Sisters, Servants of the Holy Spirit, commonly identified by the acronym SSpS, in 1975. Since its inception, has been headed by Missionary Sisters from the religious congregation within the Catholic Church. Bishop Bowers is a preparatory school with a kindergarten, primary and junior high school department. The kindergarten and primary department is located in Lartebiokorshie, and the junior high school is located in Korle-Bu.

History 
Bishop Bowers School was founded by the Missionary Sisters, Servants of the Holy Spirit in 1975.
It was named after the Late Bishop Emeritus of Accra, Bishop Joseph Oliver Bowers, in commemoration of his efforts in promoting education in the then catholic diocese of Accra: now catholic archdiocese of Accra.
In September 1975, Sis. Virginalis, SSpS from Netherlands, together with 5 teachers and two office staff members moved from sister school St. Theresa's School to start the school.
The school opened its doors to 226 pupils from kindergarten to class 5.
These were pupils who lived around Larterbiorkorshie, Mamprobi and Korle-Bu but attended St. Thera's School (also founded by Missionary Sisters, Servants of the Holy Spirit) in North Kaneshie
In 2015, Bishop Bowers School celebrated 40 years of providing quality education and a moral foundation to students.

Mission and aim 
The mission of the school is to deliver holistic and quality education to pupils by:
 Encouraging systematic and consistent learning habits
 Promoting and rewarding the hard work and stewardship of students
 Teaching and transmitting moral values such as discipline, courtesy and justice into pupils and students
 Developing a spirit of unity, loyalty, harmony, love and compassion.
 Raising disciplined, dedicated, god-fearing and moral citizens for the Church and nation.

The aim of the school is to provide quality education and discipline through effective teaching and learning to children of the catholic faith, as well as the general public.

Curriculum 
Teaching syllabus used in providing pupils and students with basic education is in accordance with the approved Ghana Education Service (GES) syllabus in preparation to sit the Basic Education Certificate Examination (BECE), conducted by the West African Examination Council (WAEC), needed to gain admissions into Senior High Schools.

Primary 
The primary department is located at No.3 Hutton Mills Street, Zoti, Lartebiokorshie. It has three main blocks which makes up the administration, classrooms and assemblyhall, computer laboratory, carteen, lavatories, a library and staff common room. There is also a large playground.

Junior high school 

In 1987, a request for the release of land to establish a junior high school was sent to the secretary of health through the medical administrator of Korle Bu teaching Hospital.A land was offered beside near the nurse's flats for the construction of Bishop Bowers Junior High School.

Class structures 
Both primary and junior high school department have classes with two streams. The KG1 classes are named after co-founders of the Missionary Sisters Servants of the Holy Spirit.

The KG2 classes are named after the Holy Spirit Missionary Congregation Sisters to first arrive in Ghana in 1946.

Each primary class is named after a flower to inspire beauty and character in both academic performance and character if pupils.

The junior high school classes are named after saints, to inspire exemplary behaviour.

List of past and current headmistresses 
 Sis Virginalis SSpS
 Sis. Velma SSpS
 Sis. Mary Lauren SSpS
 Sis. Theresa SSpS
 Sis. Juliana Agbozo SSpS
 Sis. Mercy Benson SSpS
 Sis. Matilda Quist SSpS

References 

Schools in Accra
Educational institutions established in 1975